Goessel is a city in Marion County, Kansas, United States.  It was named after Captain Kurt von Goessel (1852–1895) who went down with his ship, the Elbe, in the English Channel after it was rammed.  As of the 2020 census, the population of the city was 556.  It is located about 11 miles north of North Newton on the west side of K-15 highway.

History

Early history

For many millennia, the Great Plains of North America was inhabited by nomadic Native Americans.  From the 16th century to the 18th century, the Kingdom of France claimed ownership of large parts of North America. In 1762, after the French and Indian War, France secretly ceded New France to Spain per the Treaty of Fontainebleau.

19th century
In 1802, Spain returned most of the land to France. In 1803, most of the land for present-day Kansas was acquired by the United States from France as part of the 828,000-square-mile Louisiana Purchase for 2.83 cents per acre.

The Kansas Territory was organized in 1854, and Kansas became the 34th U.S. state in 1861. In 1855, Marion County was established within the Kansas Territory and included present-day Goessel.

The year 1874 saw the first wave of an immigration of Plautdietsch-speaking Russian Mennonites to south-central Kansas. The move was an attempt to preserve religious heritage and freedom after exclusion from military service was rescinded. In 1873 twelve Mennonite delegates from the Russian Empire toured Manitoba and Kansas, with the four conservative Mennonite delegates selecting the East Reserve in Manitoba and the eight liberal delegates selecting immigration to Kansas. In the next decade, one-third of Mennonites in Russia moved to North America. In 1874 a large number of Mennonites from the Molotschna Colony emigrated en masse to the United States aboard the ships Teutonia and Cimbria. This group split into two groups. The Alexanderwohl group sailed on the Cimbria and settled around present-day Goessel, and the Hoffnungsau group sailed on the Teutonia and settled around present-day Buhler and Inman.

The Alexanderwohl group split into eight communal villages. The village of Gnadenfeld (translation: Grace Field) was located where Goessel now stands. The village lasted for several years as a communal village, and then families moved onto their own larger parcels of land nearby. Several years passed before a trading center developed. The first public structure erected in Goessel was the Mennonite Brethren church in 1890, and one of the first businesses was a creamery station established that same year. In 1891 a small mercantile store was opened and Dr. Peter Richert moved into a building that was used as his doctor's office; later it became a post office. Dr. Richert read the story of Captain Kurt von Goessel, who went down with his steamship Elbe in the English Channel, and decided to submit the name Goessel to the U.S. Postal Department; the name was accepted on April 13, 1895.

20th century

In 1910, Goessel was platted and had a population of 100 people. In 1952, Goessel was incorporated and had a population of 260. In 2010, the United States Census reported 248 households and a population of 539.

On March 13, 1990, Goessel was damaged by an "extreme F5" tornado during a tornado outbreak. The severity of the damage left behind by this tornado led some meteorologists to believe that the Goessel tornado was among the strongest ever documented at that time.

Goessel is home to the Mennonite Heritage Museum, a complex of eight buildings that preserve artifacts from early Mennonite households, farms, schools, and churches and the Bethesda Mennonite Hospital.

Geography
Goessel is located at coordinates 38.2463992, -97.3489233 in the Great Plains of the state of Kansas. The county line is 1 mile west of Goessel.

Climate
The climate in this area is characterized by hot, humid summers and generally mild to cool winters with very cold periods.

Demographics

2010 census
As of the census of 2010, there were 539 people, 206 households, and 140 families residing in the city. The racial makeup of the city was 97.0% White, 0.2% African American, 0.4% Native American, 0.9% from other races, and 1.5% from two or more races. Hispanic or Latino of any race were 2.0% of the population.

There were 206 households, of which 28.2% had children under the age of 18 living with them, 57.8% were married couples living together, 7.3% had a female householder with no husband present, 2.9% had a male householder with no wife present, and 32.0% were non-families. 30.1% of all households were made up of individuals, and 18% had someone living alone who was 65 years of age or older. The average household size was 2.36 and the average family size was 2.91.

The median age in the city was 48.6 years. 22.6% of residents were under the age of 18; 5.1% were between the ages of 18 and 24; 18.9% were from 25 to 44; 23.4% were from 45 to 64; and 30.1% were 65 years of age or older. The gender makeup of the city was 45.8% male and 54.2% female.

2000 census
As of the census of 2000, there were 565 people, 203 households, and 142 families residing in the city. The racial makeup of the city was 97.70% White, 0.18% Native American, 0.18% from other races, and 1.95% from two or more races. Hispanic or Latino of any race were 0.71% of the population.

There were 203 households, of which 28.6% had children under the age of 18 living in them; 63.1% were married couples living together, 6.4% had a female householder with no husband present, and 30.0% were non-families. Individuals made up 27.6% of all households, and 17.2% had someone living alone who was 65 years of age or older. The average household size was 2.44 people, and the average family size was 2.98 people.

In the city, the population was spread out, with 21.6% under the age of 18, 7.4% from 18 to 24, 22.8% from 25 to 44, 16.1% from 45 to 64, and 32.0% who were 65 years of age or older. The median age was 43 years. For every 100 females, there were 73.8 males. For every 100 females age 18 and over, there were 71.0 males.

As of 2000 the median income for a household in the city was $33,250, and the median income for a family was $42,727. Males had a median income of $30,313 versus $18,750 for females. The per capita income for the city was $14,106. About 2.2% of families and 14.2% of the population were below the poverty line, including 1.7% of those under age 18 and 39.4% of those age 65 or over.

Area events
 Goessel Threshing Days, located at Mennonite Heritage and Agricultural Museum. Old-fashioned threshing demonstration / displaying / demonstrating antique equipment related to farming during the past century. Numerous antique tractors are displayed. Ethnic Mennonite food is available.
 Goessel Harvest Festival.

Area attractions

 Mennonite Heritage and Agricultural Museum, 200 N Poplar St. The Mennonite Heritage Museum was dedicated in 1974. It is a museum of artifacts of the Mennonites that settled in the Goessel area. The museum has eight buildings that depict the life of the immigrants who moved to Goessel.
 Alexanderwohl Mennonite Church, 1 mi north on K-15 Highway.
 Kansas Historical Marker - The Mennonites In Kansas, 1 mi north on K-15 Highway.

Government
The Goessel government consists of a mayor and five council members.  The council meets the 3rd Monday of each month at 8PM.
 City Hall, 101 S Cedar St.

Education

Public
The community is served by Goessel USD 411 public school district.
  Goessel High School, 100 E Main St.
 Goessel Junior High School, 100 E Main St.
 Goessel Elementary School, 500 E Main St.

Sports
The Goessel High School mascot is a Bluebird. One of only two schools in the nation with this mascot.

It offers football, volleyball, cross country, basketball, golf and track and field.  Goessel Jr/Sr. High School is a member of the Wheat State League and the Kansas State High School Activities Association (KSHSAA).

Past Championships:
 1976 Boys Cross Country - Class 1A 
 1988 Boys Basketball - Class 1A 
 2015 Scholars' Bowl - Class 1A
 2015 Volleyball - Class 1A
 2016 Girls Cross Country - Class 1A

Library
Each USD 411 school has a library for student access.

The city is served by the Goessel City Library at 101 South Cedar Street.  The library is a member of the North Central Kansas Libraries System, which provides an inter-library book loan service for its members.

Media

Print
 Hillsboro Free Press, free newspaper for greater Marion County area.
 The Newton Kansan, regional newspaper from Newton.

Radio
Goessel is served by numerous radio stations of the Wichita-Hutchinson listening market area, and satellite radio.  See Media in Wichita, Kansas.

Television
Goessel is served by over-the-air ATSC digital TV of the Wichita-Hutchinson viewing market area, cable TV, and satellite TV.  See Media in Wichita, Kansas.

Infrastructure

Transportation
K-15 highway runs along the east side of the city.

Utilities
 Internet
 DSL is provided by Moundridge Telephone Company.
 Wireless is provided by Pixius Communications.
 Satellite is provided by HughesNet, StarBand, WildBlue.
 TV
 Cable is provided by Moundridge Telephone Company.
 Satellite is provided by DirecTV, Dish Network.
 Terrestrial is provided by regional digital TV stations.
 Phone
 Landline is provided by Moundridge Telephone Company.
 Electricity
 City is provided by Westar Energy.
 Rural is provided by Westar Energy and Flint Hills RECA.
 Natural Gas
 Service is provided by Kansas Gas Service.
 Water 
 City is provided by Marion County RWD #4, billed by City of Goessel.
 Rural is provided by Marion County RWD #4 (map) and Harvey County RWD #1 (map).
 Sewer
 Service is provided by City of Goessel.
 Trash
 Service is provided by City of Goessel.

Notable people
 Ira Anders (1942), politician
 Wes Buller (1928-2018), football coach
 Shirley Knight (1936-2020), American stage, screen, and television actress. Academy Award-nominated actress.
 Duane D. Thiessen (1951), Major General, United States Marine Corps.

See also
 National Register of Historic Places listings in Marion County, Kansas
 Historical Maps of Marion County, Kansas
 Chisholm Trail
 Threshing Stone

References

Further reading

 In Earlier Days: A History of Goessel, Kansas; Marjorie Jantzen; Mennonite Immigrant Historical Foundation; 1987.
 A Heritage of Care : A History of the Mennonite Bethesda Society, Bethesda Home, Goessel Kansas; Kristine Flaming Schmucker.
 Alexanderwohl Villages in Kansas, 1874 (map) ; P.U. Schmidt; Mennonite Life; October 1949.
 The Alexanderwohl Church Building; Alvin Gooseen; Mennonite Life; December 1974.

External links

City
 
 Goessel - Directory of Public Officials, League of Kansas Municipalities
Historical
 Marion County cemetery list, archive of KsGenWeb
 Marion County history bibliography,  Marion County school bibliography, Kansas Historical Society
Maps
 Goessel city map, KDOT
 Topo Map of Goessel and Walton area, USGS

Cities in Kansas
Cities in Marion County, Kansas
Mennonitism in Kansas
German-Russian culture in Kansas
Mennonitism in Ukraine
Populated places established in 1910
1910 establishments in Kansas
Russian Mennonite diaspora in the United States